Bennett Mountain, also commonly known as Bennett Peak, is a  summit in the Sonoma Mountains of California.  Located on the west edge of Annadel State Park, it separates Bennett Valley in the Russian River drainage basin from Sonoma Valley in the Sonoma Creek drainage basin.

Bennett Valley was named for James N. Bennett, an emigrant from Illinois who settled in the area in the 19th century.

The mountain was burned following the October 2017 Northern California wildfires.

Viticulture
Grapes were planted on Bennett Mountain as early as 1862, when Isaac DeTurk planted  at the base of its western slope. By 1878 he was producing  of wine from his own and purchased grapes at a winery on Grange and Bennett Valley roads.  Since 2003, the summit has formed the eastern edge of the Bennett Valley AVA.

See also
 Ledson Marsh
 List of summits of the San Francisco Bay Area
 Sonoma Mountain
 Taylor Mountain (Sonoma County, California)

References

External links
 

Sonoma Mountains
Mountains of Sonoma County, California
Geography of Santa Rosa, California
Mountains of the San Francisco Bay Area
Mountains of Northern California